The Vias GmbH (stylized VIAS) is a rail service company based in Frankfurt (Germany). The name of the company was taken from the Latin word via for way and the letter S for service. It operates rail services in the states of Hesse, Rhineland-Palatinate and North Rhine-Westphalia.

Owners 
The company was founded in 2005 by Stadtwerke Verkehrsgesellschaft Frankfurt am Main (VGF, the municipal transport company of Frankfurt) and Rurtalbahn GmbH (RTB) of Düren with both companies having equal shareholdings.
 
In March 2010, Danish State Railways announced that it had taken over VGF's shareholding with the help of its subsidiary DSB Deutschland GmbH.

History
On 22 October 2010, Düren-based Vias DN2011 GmbH was founded by its shareholders, DSB Deutschland GmbH and R.A.T.H. GmbH with the aim of providing rail services. This company was first registered as Vias Odenwaldbahn GmbH on 19 February 2014 and renamed Vias Rail GmbH on 22 June 2015. In the meantime R.A.T.H. GmbH had become its sole shareholder. On 13 December 2015, Vias Rail GmbH took over the public transport services on the Odenwald network from Vias GmbH.

Rail services

Lines in Hesse and Rhineland-Palatinate 
 
Vias has operated the approximately 210-kilometre-long Odenwald Railway network on behalf of the Rhein-Main-Verkehrsverbund (RMV) and the state of Baden-Württemberg since 11 December 2005. It has also operated the East Rhine Railway since 12 December 2010 and the Pfungstadt Railway since 10 December 2011. It now operates on the following lines:
 

 
The designation of the lines corresponds to the numbering of the RMV.

 
Since the commencement of operations in the Odenwald, 22 brand new Bombardier Itino diesel railcars have been supplied by the Fahrzeugmanagement Region Frankfurt RheinMain GmbH (fahma) for the operations. The maintenance takes place in the workshop of Odenwaldbahn-Infrastruktur GmbH in Michelstadt, which is also the location of the operating centre. Four more sets of the same type were ordered by the RMV in August 2007 due to a lack of capacity and were delivered in the spring of 2010. These are also used on the Pfungstadt Railway, which was restored to operation from the 2011/2012 timetable change.
 
In addition, Vias also took over the RheingauLinie local service on the East Rhine Railway between Neuwied, Koblenz Hbf (and Stadtmitte), Wiesbaden Hbf and Frankfurt Hauptbahnhof (RMV line 10) at the 2010/2011 timetable change in December 2010. 5 three-car and 14 four-car FLIRT electric multiple units were ordered for its operation.
 
In December 2013, VIAS Rail GmbH won the tender for the operation of the Odenwald Railway and the Pfungstadt Railway. The new contract is valid from December 2015 for 12 years. The existing Itino sets will continue to be used, although adjustments to capacity have been made for some journeys. At least one train conductor is present in addition to the driver for all journeys.

Lines in North Rhine-Westphalia 
 
On 26 March 2015, the Verkehrsverbund Rhein-Ruhr and Nahverkehr Rheinland (Rhineland local transport association) announced that Vias would operate the North Rhine-Westphalia Regionalbahn services RB 34 (Schwalm-Nette-Bahn from Mönchengladbach to Dalheim) and the northern part of the RB 38 service (the Erft-Bahn from Düsseldorf via Grevenbroich to Bedburg) from the timetable change on 10 December 2017. The RB 38 would no longer use its whole former route from the timetable change; instead passengers would have to change in Bedburg. The northern part is operated by Vias and has been renamed the RB 39. The transport association for the Rhineland (Nahverkehr Rheinland—Rhineland local transport) plans to electrify the southern (Bedburg-Cologne) section and operate it as an S-Bahn service, while the Verkehrsverbund Rhein-Ruhr, which is the transport authority that administers the northern section of the route has rejected the electrification of the line for "transport and economic reasons." Twelve new Alstom Coradia LINT sets (nine LINT 54H and three LINT 41H) are operated on the two lines. The contract for operating the service was signed with the new operator Vias for twelve years on 16 April 2015.
 
Thus, Vias GmbH has operated on the following lines in NRW since the timetable change in December 2017:

References

External links 

  Website of Vias GmbH

Transport in Hesse
Railway companies of Germany
Private railway companies of Germany